Marisue Jacutin de Mariona (born 14 May 1979) is a Filipino former professional tennis player.

Jacutin is originally from Cagayan de Oro but now lives in the United States.

Short in stature at five foot, Jacutin was a right-handed player with a double-handed forehand and appeared in 14 Fed Cup ties for the Philippines in the late 1990s. She also represented her country at the Southeast Asian Games.

In 1999 she moved to the United States and played collegiate tennis for Oklahoma City University. While in college she made the occasional appearances in professional tournaments and continued to compete briefly after graduation.

She and husband Rodrigo, a Salvadorian native, are the parents of soccer player Javier Mariona, who competes for the Oakland Roots. Her father in law is former El Salvodor international footballer Salvador Mariona.

References

External links
 
 
 

1979 births
Living people
Filipino female tennis players
Sportspeople from Cagayan de Oro
Oklahoma City Stars athletes
College women's tennis players in the United States
Southeast Asian Games medalists in tennis
Southeast Asian Games silver medalists for the Philippines
Southeast Asian Games bronze medalists for the Philippines
Competitors at the 1997 Southeast Asian Games
Competitors at the 1999 Southeast Asian Games
Filipino emigrants to the United States